Tritonia coralliumrubri is a species of dendronotid nudibranch. It is a marine gastropod mollusc in the family Tritoniidae. It feeds on the octocoral Corallium rubrum, the red coral.

Distribution
This species was found at Capo Caccia, Alghero, NW Sardinia, at 100 m depth, .

References

Tritoniidae
Gastropods described in 2014